Vice admiral Sir David Granville Clutterbuck  (25 January 1913 – 13 December 2008) was a Royal Navy officer who became NATO's Deputy Supreme Allied Commander Atlantic in 1966.

Naval career
He served in World War II on the cruiser , seeing action in the Eastern Mediterranean Sea; escorting several Malta relief convoys, landing (and then evacuating) Allied troops from Greece, and being present at the Battle of Cape Matapan. His next ship was the heavy cruiser  taking part in the invasion of Sicily. He was appointed naval attaché in Bonn in 1954, Captain of the cruiser  in 1960 and Chief of Staff to the Commander-in-Chief Home Fleet in 1963. He went on to be Deputy Supreme Allied Commander Atlantic in 1966 and retired in 1968.

Civilian life
After retiring from military life, Sir David Clutterbuck became the first Director General of the Association of MBAs in 1969 (which carried the name Business Graduates Association until 1987).

Family
In 1937 he married Rose Mere Vaile; they had two daughters.

References

1913 births
2008 deaths
Knights Commander of the Order of the British Empire
Companions of the Order of the Bath
Royal Navy vice admirals
Royal Navy officers of World War II